Trombay is an eastern suburb of Mumbai (Bombay), India.

History

Trombay was called Neat's Tongue because of its shape. Once, it was an island nearly 5 km east of Mumbai and was about 8 km in length and 8 km in width. The island contains several ruins of Portuguese churches from the 1620s and 1630s.

In 1928, the Great Indian Peninsular Railway opened the Trombay-Andheri line called the Salsette Trombay Railway or Central Salsette Tramway.

See also
 Anushakti Nagar

References

Suburbs of Mumbai